This is an incomplete list of artworks in the Frick Collection in New York City, United States, which mainly holds European artworks from before the 20th century.

Paintings

Sculpture

Notes

References

External links
The Frick Collection website

Frick Collection
 List
Frick Collection